This is an incomplete list of March for Our Lives events that took place on June 11, 2022.

United States
Listed below are over 400 locations in the U.S. with scheduled events in support of the March for Our Lives on or around Saturday, June 11, 2022.

References

External links
 

2022 protests
2022 in American politics
2022-related lists
Gun politics in the United States
Stoneman Douglas High School shooting